Bob Schwalberg (October 12, 1927 – October 8, 1996) was an American photojournalist and writer on photographic technique and equipment.

Career
Schwalberg was a photojournalist who worked for PIX Publishing, an early New York City photo agency which from 1935 to 1969 supplied news and feature photos to magazines, especially Life and, later, Sports Illustrated.

From 1950 he was a writer of technical stories in Popular Photography magazine and for many years produced a regular column for the magazine. He became known as Mr. Leica, an expert on camera equipment, having worked for the manufacturer of E.Leitz GmbH in Wetzlar in their public relations and  product design departments for nearly 7 years, and as a European correspondent, before returning to write for Popular Photography.

Recognition
Two of Schwalberg's photographs were included by curator Edward Steichen in the world-touring The Family of Man exhibition, seen by 9 million viewers. In one, two women spectators at a sports event, photographed at close range, scream ecstatically while the surrounding men remain unmoved. The second, a policeman photographed from above and panned at a slow shutter speed as he walked, shows only his dark uniform against the slightly blurred pavement in an abstract representation of the presence of the law.

Death and legacy
Schwalberg died a few days before his 69th birthday and was remembered at a memorial on March 4, 1997, at the Metropolitan Center, 123 West 18th Street, New York City.

References

1927 births
1996 deaths
20th-century American photographers
American photojournalists
Place of birth missing
Place of death missing